The Moskvoretskaya Formation is a Middle Jurassic (Bathonian stage) geologic formation in the European part of Russia. It consists of continental claystones, siltstones and sandstones deposited in karstified segments of underlying Middle Carboniferous limestone, that would have formed underground aquifers.

The formation is divided up into two members, the lower consists of dark clays to silts and is highly fossiliferous, while the upper member is sandy and lean in fossil content. 

The remains of indeterminate tetanuran dinosaurs are known from the formation. As are fossil flora, fish and abundant remains of the turtle Heckerochelys romani, and various other fossils.

Fossil content

Amphibians

Reptiles

Turtles

Crocodyliforms

Lepidosauromorpha

Dinosaurs

Therapsids

Fish 
 Ceratodus segnis
 Ischyodus cf. egertoni
 Hybodus sp.
 Lepidotes sp.
 Ptycholepis sp.
 Dapediidae indet.

Flora 
 Cedrus sp.
 Picea sp.
 Pinus sp.
 Bennettitales indet.
 Cyatheaceae indet.
 Cycadales indet.
 Gingkoales indet.
 Gleicheniaceae indet.
 Peltaspermales indet.

Other 
 Scyadopitys verticillata
 cf. Gobiops sp.
 Caudata indet.

See also 
 List of dinosaur-bearing rock formations
 List of stratigraphic units with indeterminate dinosaur fossils
 List of fossiliferous stratigraphic units in Russia
 Mitchell Plain, karst field in Mississippian limestone in Indiana, United States
 Bemaraha Formation, Bathonian dinosaur-bearing formation of Madagascar
 Itat Formation, Middle Jurassic fossiliferous formation of Western Siberia

References

Bibliography

Further reading 
 

Geologic formations of Russia
Jurassic System of Europe
Middle Jurassic Europe
Jurassic Russia
Bathonian Stage
Sandstone formations
Shale formations
Siltstone formations
Lacustrine deposits
Karst fields
Paleontology in Russia
Formations